The Feldberg is a hill, in the Bavarian Rhön, northeast of Sandberg and south of the village of Kilianshof. The Feldberg is a southeastern spur of the des Kreuzbergs.

The Feldberg near Sandberg in the Bavarian Rhön should not be confused with the mountain of Feldberg in the Hessian Rhön near Sandberg (Gersfeld).

References 

Rhön-Grabfeld
Mountains and hills of the Rhön